Igor Borisovich Aslanyan (born March 21, 1967) is a Russian retired professional footballer. He made his professional debut in the Soviet Second League in 1988 for FC Torpedo Vladimir.

Honours
 Russian Cup winner: 1993.

References

1967 births
Living people
Soviet footballers
Russian footballers
FC Asmaral Moscow players
Russian Premier League players
FC Torpedo Moscow players
FC Torpedo-2 players
FC Lokomotiv Nizhny Novgorod players
FC Saturn Ramenskoye players
Association football midfielders
FC Torpedo Vladimir players